Varshangal Poyathariyathe is a 1987 Indian Malayalam film, directed by Mohan Roop. The film stars debutants Prince Vaidyan and Reshmi Kailas along with Sukumari, Innocent, Nedumudi Venu and Menaka in the supporting roles. The film has musical score by Mohan Sithara.

Plot
A man falls in love with his professor's daughter. However, when she realises that she has mental health problems, she decides to get separated him from her.

Cast
Rashmi Kailas as Veni
Prince Vaidyan as Unnikrishnan
Sukumari as Bhagi
Innocent
Nedumudi Venu as Professor, Veni's father
Menaka as Lakshmikutty
Jagannatha Varma as Doctor
Kalanilayam Omana
Sindhu Varma

Soundtrack
The music was composed by Mohan Sithara and the lyrics were written by Kottakkal Kunjimoideen Kutty.

References

External links
 

1987 films
1980s Malayalam-language films
Films scored by Mohan Sithara